Denis Crispin Twitchett (23 September 192524 February 2006) was a British Sinologist and scholar who specialized in Chinese history, and is well known as one of the co-editors of The Cambridge History of China.

Biography
Denis Twitchett was born on 23 September 1925 in London, England, the son of an architectural draughtsman, and attended Isleworth County Grammar School. During World War II he took a crash course in Japanese, and for the remainder of the war he was part of the Bletchley Park operations acting as a listener at one of the forward listening stations in Sri Lanka. He also spent a great deal of time in Japan, and was able to learn from the best Japanese historians of China (who tended to focus on Tang China, a period which became his field of expertise also). Following demobilisation he read Modern Chinese at the School of Oriental and African Studies at the University of London for a year (1946–47). Having won a scholarship to read Geography in 1943 while still a school pupil, he then took up his place at St Catharine's College, Cambridge, whence he graduated with a first-class degree in Oriental Studies in 1950.
 
He was a lecturer at the University of London (1954–56) and Cambridge (1956–60), the Chair of Chinese at the universities of London (1960–68) and Cambridge (1968–80), and the Gordon Wu '58 Professor of Chinese Studies at Princeton University (1980–94). He was a fellow of the British Academy from 1967. He greatly expanded the role of Chinese studies in Western intellectual circles.

He married Umeko Ichikawa in 1956. Together they had two children.

The Cambridge History of China 

Starting in 1966, Professor Twitchett and historian John K. Fairbank (who taught at Harvard) began plans for the first comprehensive history of China to be published in the English language. Originally expected to be a six volume set of books, the series expanded as time passed and eventually grew to the currently planned 15 volumes. While he was at Princeton, Twitchett worked closely with fellow Sinologist Frederick W. Mote (who had a related wartime experience).

Drawing upon the most respected living historians for individual chapters of the books, the series (though still missing one volume as of 2022) is very highly regarded as an authoritative history of China. Twitchett wrote many sections and guided the creation of the whole series from the start until his death.

Twitchett deliberately held off creating a book on China before the Ch'in dynasty because, as Twitchett put it in the preface to Volume 7, there was still so much work to be done on the period. Since that time the history has become better understood and in 1999 a companion volume The Cambridge History of Ancient China, From the Origins of Civilization to 221 BC edited by Michael Loewe and Edward L. Shaughnessy was published.

Other publications
 
 Financial Administration under the T'ang Dynasty (1963)
 Printing and Publishing in Medieval China (1983)
 The Writing of Official History Under the T'ang (1992)
 (with P.J.M. Geelan) The Times Atlas of China (1974)

Twitchett was the expert who helped create the China maps for The Times Atlas of World History (first published in 1979).

References

External links
 Obituary in The Times
 David McMullen, "Denis Crispin Twitchett (1925-2006)," Proceedings of the British Academy 166 (2010): 322–345. 

1925 births
2006 deaths
British sinologists
Historians of China
Alumni of SOAS University of London
Alumni of St Catharine's College, Cambridge
Academics of the University of London
Academics of the University of Cambridge
Princeton University faculty
Fellows of the British Academy
Bletchley Park people